The North Ayrshire by-election was a Parliamentary by-election held on 20 December 1911. The constituency returned one Member of Parliament (MP) to the House of Commons of the United Kingdom, elected by the first past the post voting system.

Vacancy
Andrew Anderson, the Liberal MP since he gained the seat in January 1910 from the Unionists, was appointed Solicitor General for Scotland, a law officer of the Crown. In accordance with the constitutional arrangements of the day, he was obliged to resign as an MP and fight a by-election.

Electoral history

Candidates
Anderson’s Unionist opponent was again Capt. Duncan Frederick Campbell who had stood here last time. He had contested Mid-Lanark in 1906 and Paisley in January 1910 without success.

There was no Labour candidate, even though they had contested the seat in 1906 and January 1910, finishing a poor third on both occasions.

Campaign
The contest was dominated by the government’s legislation on National Insurance and the uncertainties this legislation would produce for individual electors, particularly small manufacturers and shopkeepers.

Result

Although there was no Labour candidate, Anderson was thought to have lost some support among working-class voters because of his opposition to Labour candidates in other recent elections. After six years of Liberal government, the electors of North Ayrshire reverted to their more traditional allegiances, perhaps rebelling against the background of the rapid social changes being introduced by H H Asquith’s reforming administration.

Aftermath
After the election, Anderson agreed to be re-adopted as prospective Liberal candidate for North Ayrshire, expressing a wish to contest the seat again. A General Election was due to take place by the end of 1915. By the autumn of 1914, the following candidates had been adopted to contest that election. Due to the outbreak of war, the election never took place. 
Unionist Party: Duncan Campbell
Liberal Party: Andrew Anderson
Campbell was killed in action in 1916.

References

1911 elections in the United Kingdom
1911 in Scotland
1910s elections in Scotland
North Ayrshire
Politics of Ayrshire
Ayrshire, North
Ministerial by-elections to the Parliament of the United Kingdom
December 1911 events